Irene "Rena" Dourou (born 7 October 1974) is a Greek political scientist and politician of the Coalition of the Radical Left (Syriza). From 2014 to 2019, she served as the Regional Governor of Attica. She lost Re-election to New Democracy (Greece) Candidate Giorgios Patoulis on July 7, 2019.

Early life and education
Born 1974 in Aigaleo to a police officer and a stay-at-home mother, whom Dourou later described as conservative yet open-minded, she was raised in Western Athens working-class suburb Egaleo. Active in the anti-globalization movement, she helped founding Synaspismos Youth in 1995.

Dourou took up her studies to become a teacher at Athens University. Following her graduation she was rewarded a scholarship to University of Essex in the United Kingdom where she enrolled in political science and earned a master's degree. Though Dourou was encouraged to pursue a Ph.D., she decided to return to Greece, where in 2004 she joined the newly founded Syriza party.

Apart from Greek, Dourou is fluent in English, French, Italian and Turkish.

Political career
In the two consecutive legislative elections of May and June 2012, she was elected a member of the Hellenic Parliament for the suburban Athens B constituency.

In a television appearance on 7 June 2012, far-right Golden Dawn party's MP Ilias Kasidiaris threw a glass of water at Dourou, proceeding to physically assault Liana Kanelli after she objected to his behavior. The incident caused an uproar, both nationally and internationally, and was widely seen as a moment of revelation regarding Golden Dawn's violent agenda.

Following the elections, Dourou was appointed to the Shadow Cabinet of Alexis Tsipras, where she was made responsible for foreign policy. In the beginning, Dourou had to cope with prejudices against female politicians, with a Kathimerini commentator railing that the "nice blonde" be rather "a qualified kindergarten teacher" than qualified on foreign policy issues. However, she fought her way through male dominance and sexism, defining Syriza's defence and foreign policy, as to be increasingly described her party's "rising star".

Governor of Attica

On 26 March 2014, well ahead of the local elections in May, she ceded her parliamentary seat to her party's first runner-up Eleni Avlonitou in order to fully concentrate on campaigning for regional governor of Attica. For her all-in decision, she gained further respect, being referred to as the first member of parliament to do so.

Running a door-to-door campaign on an electoral platform called "Power of Life", she challenged incumbent Giannis Sgouros who ran for the social-liberal "Social Values" party, and won the first round. Though in the decisive runoff ballot, Sgouros had the backing of both Nea Dimokratia and PASOK parties, Dourou defeated him with 50.83% of the popular vote. Ahead of Syriza's victory at the January 2015 legislative election, her election as regional governor was widely described as Syriza's biggest victory so far.

In charge of a €575m annual budget, she immediately increased social welfare spending from €1.9m to €13.5m in order to establish food banks, health care for the uninsured. She also ordered tens of thousands disconnected from electricity to be reconnected. She was criticized by Minister of Administrative Reform Kyriakos Mitsotakis for supporting 19 mayors who refused to hand over municipal workers' files for evaluation.

Controversies
Dourou was heavily criticized for her decision to scrap four tenders for waste management plants. It was estimated that her decision lost 200 million of funding with ecological implications and a lack of capacity in the Attica waste management system. Deputy Development Minister Notis Mitarakis called on Dourou to "realize the difference between governing and protesting." He also argued that the Attica governor could not cancel the tenders on her own. 
 
Dourou is in favor of the separation of the church and state and took a non-religious oath when she was sworn in as governor, eliciting criticism from conservative and right-wing milieus.

References

External links
  
 

1974 births
Living people
National and Kapodistrian University of Athens alumni
Alumni of the University of Essex
Greek political scientists
Greek expatriates in England
Syriza politicians
Greek MPs 2012 (May)
Greek MPs 2012–2014
Regional governors of Greece
21st-century Greek politicians
21st-century Greek women politicians
Women political scientists
Politicians from Athens
Women governors and heads of sub-national entities